Trigger Fingers is a 1924 American silent Western film directed by B. Reeves Eason and starring Bob Custer, George Field, and Margaret Landis.

Plot
As described in a review in a film magazine, in order to better be able to run down a notorious bandit, “The Black Hawk,” Sgt. Steele (Custer) of the Rangers, who has captured another bandit, “Lightning” Brady, impersonates him and joins the gang of unsavory characters led by Murtison (Bennett). Soon he finds The Black Hawk has attacked an official of the mining company and paralyzed his sense of speech. He sends for Dr. Deering (Field), who arrives with his daughter, Ruth (Landis), but returns for instruments and fails to come back. Instead, Murtison’s gang attacks Steele and, in the rumpus, Murtison is killed by The Black Hawk. The gang captures Ruth and a young Indian woman, Wetona (La Rue), and takes them away. Steele rescues them and returns to the shack to find The Black Hawk bending over the patient, who has recovered his speech. Steele forces him to unmask and finds he is Dr. Deering. During a terrific fight, Deering is shot by Wetona. Ruth is shocked to find her father is a bandit, but finds consolation in the love of Steele, who reveals his real identity to her.

Cast

Preservation
With no prints of Trigger Fingers located in any film archives, it is a lost film.

References

Bibliography
 Rainey, Buck. The Strong, Silent Type: Over 100 Screen Cowboys, 1903-1930. McFarland, 2004.

External links
 
 

1924 films
1924 Western (genre) films
Films directed by B. Reeves Eason
American black-and-white films
Film Booking Offices of America films
Silent American Western (genre) films
1920s English-language films
1920s American films